The following list includes settlements, geographic features, and political subdivisions of Iowa whose names are derived from Native American languages.

Listings

State
 Iowa – from Dakota ayúxba or ayuxwe, via French Aiouez.

Counties

 Allamakee County
 Appanoose County
 Cherokee County – named after the Cherokee people.
 City of Cherokee
 Chickasaw County – named after the Chickasaw people.
 Keokuk County – named after the Sauk chief Keokuk.
 City of Keokuk
 Mahaska County
 Muscatine County
 Osceola County – named after the Seminole leader Osceola
 City of Osceola
 Pocahontas County
 Pottawattamie County
 Poweshiek County
 Sac County
 Sioux County – named after the Sioux nation
 Sioux City
 City of Little Sioux, Iowa
 Big Sioux River
 Little Sioux River
 Tama County
 Wapello County – named after Wapello, a Meskwaki chief
 Winnebago County
 Winnebago River
 Winneshiek County

Communities

 Iowa City
 Iowa River
 Upper Iowa River
 Algona
 Anamosa – named after the legend of a local Native American girl
 Battle Creek – named for a skirmish between Native American tribes near the stream.
 Camanche, named after the Camanche
 Chillicothe
 Coon Rapids
 Coon Creek
 Dakota City
 Decorah
 Hiawatha
 Jamaica
 Kanawha
 Keomah Village
 Lake Keomah
 Lake Keomah State Park
 Keosauqua – named after the Meskwaki and Sauk name for the Des Moines River.
 Keota
 Lakota
 Lehigh
 Maquoketa
 Maquoketa Caves State Park
 Ocheyedan
 Ocheyedan River

Bodies of water

 Canoe Creek
 Ioway Creek
 Kanaranzi Creek
 Maquoketa River
 Little Maquoketa River
 Mississippi River
 Missouri River
 Nishnabotna River
 Nodaway River
 Raccoon River
 Wapsipinicon River

See also
List of place names in the United States of Native American origin

References

Citations

Sources

 Bright, William (2004). Native American Placenames of the United States. Norman: University of Oklahoma Press. .

 
 
Iowa geography-related lists